Jerry Garcia / David Grisman is an album of folk music by Jerry Garcia and David Grisman. It was the second album released under Grisman's record label Acoustic Disc (after Dawg '90).

Jerry Garcia / David Grisman was nominated for a Grammy Award for Best Contemporary Folk Album.

Track listing 
"The Thrill is Gone" (Hawkins, Rick Darnell)
"Grateful Dawg" (Garcia, Grisman)
"Two Soldiers" (traditional)
"Friend of the Devil" (Garcia, Hunter, Dawson)
"Russian Lullaby" (Berlin)
"Dawg's Waltz" (Grisman)
"Walkin' Boss" (traditional)
"Rockin' Chair" (Carmichael)
"Arabia" (Grisman; middle part based on the Cuban folk theme "Hasta Siempre")

Personnel

Musicians

Jerry Garcia – guitar, vocals
David Grisman – mandolin
Jim Kerwin – bass
Joe Craven – percussion, fiddle

Production

Produced by Jerry Garcia and David Grisman
Recorded by David Dennison
Mixed by Jerry & Dawg with Decibel Dave
Production assistance by Craig Miller
Mastered by Paul Stubblebine
Cover design by David Grisman & Django Bayless
Photography by Gary Nichols
Strings by D'Addario

See also
 Acoustic Disc

References 

1991 albums
Acoustic Disc albums
David Grisman albums
Jerry Garcia albums
Collaborative albums